Raja Azeem Hafeez (born 29 July 1963) is a former Pakistani cricketer who played 18 Test matches
between 1983 and 1985.

A left-arm fast bowler, Hafeez was known for his birth defect: he has two fingers missing on his right (non-bowling) hand. Hafeez never established himself in the Pakistani team, predominantly because of the strength of its fast bowling at that time, anchored by Wasim Akram and Waqar Younis.

References

External links
 

1963 births
Living people
Pakistan One Day International cricketers
Pakistan Test cricketers
People from Jhelum
Pakistani cricketers
Allied Bank Limited cricketers
Karachi Blues cricketers
Karachi cricketers
Pakistan National Shipping Corporation cricketers
Pakistan International Airlines cricketers